Agaricochaete is a genus of fungi in the Pleurotaceae family. The genus contains four species found in Africa and Asia.

References

External links

Pleurotaceae
Agaricales genera